State Highway 34 (SH 34) is a New Zealand state highway in the Bay of Plenty region in the North Island. It links the forestry town of Kawerau to Tauranga, Rotorua and Whakatane.

Route description
SH 34 begins at  just west of Edgecumbe. SH 34 travels south on Awaiti South Road and Hallett Road. It reaches  where it shares a short concurrency, turning left then immediately right. SH 34 then travels south-west through the northern outskirts of Kawerau and past the Tasman Pulp and Paper Mill. It continues westwards until it intersects SH 30 again and terminates. The highway was gazetted in the early 1990s.

See also
 List of New Zealand state highways

References

External links
 New Zealand Transport Agency

34
Transport in the Bay of Plenty Region